The Childs–Brown House is an historic house in Pawtucket, Rhode Island.  It is a two-story wood-frame structure, roughly square in shape, with a low-pitch hipped roof broken by dormer roofs.  An ell extends to the rear of the house.  Both the eaves and the roof of the front porch exhibit heavy brackets typical of the Italianate style.  The interior also retains Italianate style in its woodwork, most prominently in the semi-elliptical main stairway.  Built in 1868–69 for Alfred L. Childs, an ice dealer, it was for a number of years owned by members of the Brown family prominent in Rhode Island civic and economic life.

The house was listed on the National Register of Historic Places in 1983.

See also
National Register of Historic Places listings in Pawtucket, Rhode Island

References

Houses completed in 1868
Houses on the National Register of Historic Places in Rhode Island
Houses in Pawtucket, Rhode Island
National Register of Historic Places in Pawtucket, Rhode Island